Franz Fedier (1922–2005) was a Swiss painter.

References
This article was initially translated from the German Wikipedia.

1922 births
2005 deaths
20th-century Swiss painters
Swiss male painters
20th-century Swiss male artists